Scharstorf station is a railway station in the Scharstorf district in the municipality of Prisannewitz, located in the Rostock district in Mecklenburg-Vorpommern, Germany.

References

Railway stations in Mecklenburg-Western Pomerania
Buildings and structures in Rostock (district)
Rostock S-Bahn stations